The Morris Silverman House is a historic house in Helena, Montana, U.S.. It was built in 1890 for Morris Silverman, a Russian Jewish immigrant. His daughter Dorothy, a schoolteacher, lived in the house until 1969. It has been listed on the National Register of Historic Places since June 14, 1982.

References

Houses on the National Register of Historic Places in Montana
Houses completed in 1890
Houses in Lewis and Clark County, Montana
Queen Anne architecture in Montana